LaLa Ri is the stage name of LaRico Demetrius Potts (born August 28, 1990), an American drag performer most known for competing on season 13 of RuPaul's Drag Race.

Career
LaLa Ri competed on season 13 of RuPaul's Drag Race. Prior to appearing on the show, she had worked as a professional drag queen for three years. Vulture.com said she "gave a series-best lip sync in a series-worst outfit". She was named Miss Congeniality.

In 2021, she released the song "Bad Bitch Tip" and appeared on KLP's track "Eat the Runway". She also appears on Honey Davenport's EP Love Is God.

Personal life
LaLa Ri is based in Atlanta.

Filmography

Television

Awards and nominations

References

External links

 Lala Ri at IMDb

Living people
1990 births
African-American drag queens
People from Atlanta
LaLa Ri